Limestone Lake is a lake in Northern Manitoba, Canada. It is in the Hudson Bay drainage basin and is the source of the Limestone River.

There are two named bays on the lake: Kinoseeti Bay at the east; and Sakawisew Bay, from which the Limestone River flows, at the north.

The closest access point is Little Churchill River/Dunlop's Fly In Lodge Aerodrome,  to the west on Waskaiowaka Lake.

References

Lakes of Northern Manitoba
Hudson Bay drainage basin